Tideway Scullers School is a rowing club on the Tideway of the River Thames next to Chiswick Bridge in Chiswick, London.

The club previously held the headship for the Head of the River Race (2009), the largest UK eights event, and the senior squad holds the record for the Head of the River Fours course.

History

Alec Hodges was a founder member and an organiser of Tideway Scullers School in approximately 1957, filling all offices of the club at one time or another over the years. He was the driving force behind getting the TSS boathouse built in 1984, along with Lou Barry and Cyril Bishop.

Hodges was among early coaches to have coached the school's (club's) crews to wins at Henley and he took new scullers, from the youngest to the oldest, under his wing, sorting out or lending them boats so they could enjoy the sport he loved. Even when well in his seventies he would take three or four scullers out, one after another, setting them on the road to sculling. He organised sculling courses every year, twisting the arms of many people to help, and these courses were the start of many successful sculling careers, including world champion Debbie Flood.

The club is believed to be the only non-academic related club named 'School' for sculling, which is the propelling of boats with starboard and port oars for each oarsman or oarswoman. Rowing has also been conducted from the site directly east of Chiswick Bridge from the outset.

Notable members

 Saskia Budgett
 Alan Campbell
 Mahé Drysdale

Honours

Recent British champions

Honours

Henley Royal Regatta

See also
Rowing on the River Thames

References

 British Rowing Almanack - All years

Tideway Rowing clubs
Sport in the London Borough of Hounslow
Chiswick
Buildings and structures in Chiswick
Rowing clubs of the River Thames